Sortwell is a surname. Notable people with the surname include:

Alvin F. Sortwell (1854–1910), American politician
Shae Sortwell (born 1985), American politician

See also
Nickels-Sortwell House
Sartwell